Jucker is a common Swiss German surname. Notable people with this surname include:

 Albert Jucker (1844–1885), founder of Berli Jucker, a Thai import and export firm
 Beat and Martin Jucker, Swiss brothers who founded the Jucker Farm in 2000
 Ed Jucker (1916–2002), American basketball and baseball coach
 Mathias Jucker, neuroscientist and researcher at the University of Tuebingen

See also
 Jucker (disambiguation)
 Juncker, a similar surname